Carol Quillen was the 18th president of Davidson College and currently serves on the Princeton Board of Trustees. She was the first female president of Davidson College and the first non-alum president since John Rood Cunningham.

Quillen grew up in New Castle, Delaware, and attended the University of Chicago, where she was a student of Allan Bloom. After finishing her PhD at Princeton University, Quillen became a professor of history at Rice University in 1990. At Rice, Quillen eventually became a vice president, focusing on international studies.

As president, Quillen has overseen major initiatives and changes at Davidson. The college has undergone major construction projects, namely adding a new practice facility at the Baker Sports Complex and a new science center. She also aided in the transition from the Southern Conference to the Atlantic 10 Conference. During her tenure, Davidson received totaling $45 million from The Duke Endowment, the largest donation in the school's history. Quillen has also overseen the college's $425-million capital campaign. She was inducted into Omicron Delta Kappa as a faculty/staff initiate in 2012. 

Since 2016, Quillen has served as a trustee of the National Humanities Center in Research Triangle Park.

References

External links 
 Biography from the Davidson College Archives & Special Collections

Presidents of Davidson College
Presidents of the University of North Carolina System
Living people
University of Chicago alumni
Princeton University alumni
Year of birth missing (living people)